Parthenina anselmoi is a species of sea snail, a marine gastropod mollusk in the family Pyramidellidae, the pyrams and their allies.

Distribution
This species is only known from the coasts of Ghana and the Republic of the Congo.

References

External links
 To Encyclopedia of Life
 To USNM Invertebrate Zoology Mollusca Collection

Pyramidellidae
Gastropods described in 1998
Molluscs of the Atlantic Ocean